This is an alphabetical list of the fungal taxa as recorded from South Africa. Currently accepted names have been appended.

Pa
Genus: Pachyphiale
Pachyphiale cornea (Ach.) Poetsch (1872)accepted as Bacidia cornea (Ach.) A. Massal. (1852)

Genus: Paecilomyces
Paecilomyces aureo-cinnamomeum Thom.
Paecilomyces varioti Bain.
Paecilomyces sp.

Genus: Palawania
Palawania dovyalidis Nel.
Palawania eucleae Nel.
Palawania halleriae Doidge
Palawania orbiculata Doidge

Genus: Palawaniella
Palawaniella doryalidis Doidge
Palawaniella eucleae Doidge
Palawaniella orbiculata Doidge

Genus: Panaeolus
Panaeolus caliginosus Gill.
Panaeolus campanulatus Quel. accepted as Panaeolus papilionaceus (Bull. ex Fries) Quélet
Panaeolus fimicola Quel.
Panaeolus papilionaceus (Bull. ex Fries) Quélet
Panaeolus retirugis Gill. accepted as Panaeolus papilionaceus (Bull. ex Fries) Quélet
Panaeolus solidipes Peck.

Genus: Pannaria
Pannaria capensis Steiner.
Pannaria coenileobadia Massal.
Pannaria hookeri Nyl. var. leucolepis Th.Fr.
Pannaria leucolepis Nyl. 
Pannaria leucosticta Tuck. var. isidiopsis Nyl.
Pannaria lurida Nyl.
Pannaria phloeodes Stirt.
Pannaria rubiginosa Del.
Pannaria rubiginosa var. conoplea Korb.
Pannaria rubiginosa var. lanuginosa Zahlbr.
Pannaria rubiginosa var. phloeodes Stizenb.
Pannaria triptophylla Massal.
 
Family: Pannariaceae

Genus: Pannularia
Pannularia leucosticta Stizenb. var. isidiopsis Nyl.

Genus: Panus
Panus conchatus Fr.
Panus melanophyllus Fr.
Panus quaquaversus Berk.
Panus rudis Fr.
Panus stipticus Fr.
Panus stipticus var. farinaceus Rea.
Panus torulosus Fr.
Panus wrightii Berk. & Curt.

Genus: Papularia
Papularia sphaerosperma v.Hohn.

Genus: Paranectria
Paranectria minuta Hansf.
Paranectria parasitica Wint.
 
Genus: Parasterells (sic)

Genus: Parasterina
Parasterina africana v.d.Byl
Parasterina brachystoma Theiss.
Parasterina brachystoma var. laxa Doidge
Parasterina implicata Doidge
Parasterina laxa Doidge
Parasterina reticulata Doidge
Parasterina rigida Doidge
Parasterina sp.

Genus: Parastigmatea
Parastigmatea nervisita Doidge
 
Genus: Paratheliaceae
Paratheliaceae

Genus: Parathelium
Parathelium trichosporum Stizenb.

Genus: Parendomyces
Parendomyces zeylanicus Doidge

Genus: Parenglerula
Parenglerula henningsii Petrak.
Parenglerula macowaniana v.Hohn.
Parenglerula macowaniana var. elaeodendri Werd.

Genus: Parmelia (Lichens)
Parmelia abessinica Nyl. ex Kremp. (1877),accepted as Parmotrema abessinicum (Nyl. ex Kremp.) Hale (1974)
Parmelia abessinica var. sorediosa Müll.Arg.
Parmelia abyssinica Nyl.
Parmelia abyssinica var. sorediosa Müll.Arg.
Parmelia adhaerens Nyl.
Parmelia aleuriza Vain.
Parmelia amphixanthoides Steiner & Zahlbr.
Parmelia amplexa Stirt.
Parmelia angolensis Wain.
Parmelia atrichoides Nyl.
Parmelia austro-africana Stirt.
Parmelia austroafricana Zahlbr.
Parmelia borreri Turn.
Parmelia borreri var. stictica Duby.
Parmelia borreri var. ulophvlla Nyl.
Parmelia brachyphylla Müll.Arg.
Parmelia brunnthaleri Steiner & Zahlbr.
Parmelia brunnthaleri f. irregularis Gyeln.
Parmelia bylii Gyeln.
Parmelia bylii Vain.
Parmelia caesia Ach.
Parmelia caifrorum Zahlbr. 
Parmelia capensis Ach.
Parmelia capensis Nyl.
Parmelia caperata (L.) Ach. (1803),accepted as Flavoparmelia caperata (L.) Hale (1986)
Parmelia centrifuga Ach.
Parmelia ceresina Vain. 
Parmelia cetrarioides Del. 
Parmelia cetrata Ach. 
Parmelia cetrata f. ciliosa Viaud-Gr. Marais. 
Parmelia cetrata f. sorediifera Wain. 
Parmelia chlorea Stizenb. 
Parmelia citrinireagens Gyeln. 
Parmelia citrinireagens var. angustior Gyeln. 
Parmelia colorata Gyeln. 
Parmelia concolor Spreng. 
Parmelia concolor var. multifida Zahlbr. 
Parmelia concolor var. platyphylla Zahlbr. 
Parmelia concrescens Wain.
Parmelia conspersa(Ehrh. ex Ach.) Ach. (1803) accepted as Xanthoparmelia conspersa (Ehrh. ex Ach.) Hale (1974)
Parmelia conspersa f. isidiata Anzi. 
Parmelia conspersa polita, polyphylla Mey.Flotow. 
Parmelia conspersa var. austroafricana Stizenb. 
Parmelia conspersa var. benguellensis Wain. 
Parmelia conspersa var. constrictans Müll.Arg.  
Parmelia conspersa var. endomiltoides Müll.Arg.
Parmelia conspersa var. eradicata Müll.Arg. 
Parmelia conspersa var. hypoclista Nyl. 
Parmelia conspersa var. hypoclistoides Müll.Arg. 
Parmelia conspersa var. hypomelaena Vain. 
Parmelia conspersa var. incisa Zahlbr. 
Parmelia conspersa var. lacinulata Gyeln. 
Parmelia conspersa var. laxa Müll.Arg. 
Parmelia conspersa var. leonora Linds. 
Parmelia conspersa var. multifida Flotow. 
Parmelia conspersa var. polita Flotow. 
Parmelia conspersa var. polyphylla Müll.Arg. 
Parmelia conspersa var. stenophylla Ach. 
Parmelia conspersa var. subconspersa Stein. 
Parmelia conspersa var. thamnidiella Stizenb.
Parmelia conspersula Nyl. 
Parmelia constrictans Nyl. 
Parmelia constrictans var. eradicata Nyl. 
Parmelia conturbata Müll.Arg. 
Parmelia conturbata var. exomata Zahlbr. 
Parmelia cooperi Steiner & Zahlbr. 
Parmelia coronata Fee var. denudata Wain. 
Parmelia cristifera Tayl. 
Parmelia cuprea Pers. 
Parmelia digitula Nyl. var. citrinireagens Gyeln. 
Parmelia digitulata var. esaxicola Gyeln. 
Parmelia digitulata var. esaxicola f. mitrovicensis Gyeln. 
Parmelia domokosii Gyeln. 
Parmelia dregeana Hampe. 
Parmelia dubia Schaer. 
Parmelia ecaperata Müll.Arg.  
Parmelia endomiltodes Nyl. 
Parmelia euneta Stirt. 
Parmelia fas igii'a (sic) Ach. 
Parmelia fissurina Zahlbr. 
Parmelia formosa Fee var. latifolia Flotow. 
Parmelia fraxinea Ach. 
Parmelia fuliginosa Nyl. 
Parmelia glabra Nyl. 
Parmelia gracilescens Wain. var. angolensis Wain. 
Parmelia granatensis Nyl.
Parmelia hababiana Gyeln.
Parmelia hildenbrandtii Krempelh. f. nuda Stizenb.
Parmelia hildenbrandtii f. sorediosa Stizerb. 
Parmelia hildebrandtii var. nuda Müll.Arg.  
Parmelia hildebrandtii var. sorediosa Müll.Arg.
Parmelia hottentotta Ach.
Parmelia hottentotta var. diachrosta Stirt. 
Parmelia hottentotta var. pachythalla Nyl. 
Parmelia hottentotta var. phalacrum Zahlbr. 
Parmelia hypocrea Wain.
Parmelia hypoleia Nyl.
Parmelia hypoleia f. crenata Nyl.  
Parmelia hypoleia var. crenata Nyl.
Parmelia hypoleia var. tenuifida Nyl.
Parmelia hypoleioides Wain.
Parmelia hyporysalea Vain.
Parmelia imitans Gyeln. f. protoimbricatoides Gyeln.
Parmelia incisa Tayl.
Parmelia insignata Stizenb.
Parmelia interrupts (sic) Stizenb.
Parmelia isidiza Nyl.
Parmelia junodii Steiner.
Parmelia laceratula Nyl. f. phricoides Stirt. 
Parmelia laevigata (Sm.) Ach. (1814), accepted as Hypotrachyna laevigata (Sm.) Hale (1975)
Parmelia latissima Fee.
Parmelia laxa Gyeln. f. laciniata Gyeln.
Parmelia lecanoracea Müll.Arg.
Parmelia leonora Spreng.
Parmelia leonora var. multifida Flotow.
Parmelia leonora var. platyphylla Massal.
Parmelia lichinoidea Nyl.
Parmelia lugubris Pers.
Parmelia macleyana Müll.Arg.
Parmelia majoris Wain.
Parmelia melancholica Stainer & Zahlbr.
Parmelia molliuscula Ach.
Parmelia mottusca Ach.
Parmelia molybdiza Nyl.
Parmelia mougeotii Schaer.
Parmelia mougeotii var. dealbata Massal. 
Parmelia mougeotii var. obscurata Müll.Arg.
Parmelia mougeotina Nyl.
Parmelia mutabilis Tayl.
Parmelia namaensis Steiner & Zahlbr.
Parmelia natalensis Steiner & Zahlbr.
Parmelia nilgherrensis Nyl. (1874) accepted as Parmotrema arnoldii (Du Rietz) Hale (1974)
Parmelia nitens Müll.Arg.
Parmelia obscura Fr.
Parmelia oleagina Stizenb.
Parmelia olivacea Nyl.
Parmelia olivacea Ach.
Parmelia olivaria Th.Fr.
Parmelia olivetorum Nyl.
Parmelia olivetorum var. hyporysalea Wain.  
Parmelia omphalodes Ach. var. panniformis Ach.
Parmelia omphalodes var. panniformis f. crinalis Hepp.
Parmelia ostracoderma Ach.
Parmelia owaniana Stirt.
Parmelia pachythala Spreng.
Parmelia parietina Ach.
Parmelia perfissa Steiner & Zahlbr.
Parmelia perforata Ach.
Parmelia perforata f. ciliata Flotow.
Parmelia perforata var. cetrata Fr.
Parmelia perforata var. ciliata Nyl.
Parmelia perisidiosa Nyl.
Parmelia perlata (Huds.) Ach. (1803) accepted as Parmotrema perlatum (Huds.) M.Choisy (1952)
Parmelia perlata var. ciliata Duby. f. sorediifera Müll.Arg.
Parmelia perlata f. sorediifera Stizenb.
Parmelia perplexa Stizenb.
Parmelia perrugata Nyl.
Parmelia perspersa Stizenb.
Parmelia persulphurata Nyl.
Parmelia phaeophana Stirt.
Parmelia phaeophana var. stenotera Stirt.
Parmelia pilosa Stizenb.
Parmelia pilosella Hue.
Parmelia plumbea Ach.
Parmelia praetervisa Müll.Arg.
Parmelia proboscidea Tayl.
Parmelia proboscidea var. sorediifera Müll.Arg.
Parmelia prolixa Rohl.
Parmelia prolixa f. dendritica Nyl.
Parmelia prolixa var. applicata Stizenb.
Parmelia prolixula Nyl.
Parmelia pseudoconspersa Gyeln.
Parmelia quercina Ach.
Parmelia quercina f. cupiseda Wain.
Parmelia quercina var. rimulosa Zahlbr.
Parmelia resupina Stirt.
Parmelia reterimulosa Steiner & Zahlbr.
Parmelia reticulata Tayl.
Parmelia revoluta Floerke.
Parmelia roccella var. hypomecha Ach.
Parmelia rubiginosa Ach.
Parmelia rudecta Ach. (1814) accepted as Punctelia rudecta (Ach.) Krog (1982)
Parmelia rudecta var. microphyllina Nyl.
Parmelia saxatilis Ach.
Parmelia saxeti Stizenb.
Parmelia scabrosa Taylor (1847) accepted as Xanthoparmelia scabrosa (Taylor) Hale (1974)
Parmelia sehenckiana Müll.Arg.
Parmelia schenckiana f. imperfecta Gyeln.
Parmelia schenckiana f. perfecta Gyeln.
Parmelia schenckiana var. chalybaeizans Steiner & Zahlbr.
Parmelia schreuderiana Gyeln.
Parmelia scopulorum f. cornuata Ach.
Parmelia scortea Ach.
Parmelia sinuosa Ach.
Parmelia soredians Nyl.
Parmelia sphaerospora Nyl.
Parmelia squamans Stizenb.
Parmelia squamariata Nyl.
Parmelia squamariata f. cinerascens Nyl.
Parmelia standaertii Gyeln. var. africana Gyeln.
Parmelia steineri Gyeln.
Parmelia stellaris Ach.
Parmelia stenophylla du Rietz f. hypomelaena Vain.
Parmelia stenophylloides Wain.
Parmelia stictella Massal.
Parmelia subaequans Nyl.
Parmelia subcaperatula Nyl.
Parmelia subconspersa Nyl.
Parmelia subconspersa f. lobulifera Gyeln.
Parmelia subconspersa var. africana Gyeln.
Parmelia subconspersa var. benguellensis Wain
Parmelia subconspersa var. incisa Stizenb.
Parmelia subconspersa var. thamnidiella Stizenb.
Parmelia subcrustacea Gyeln.
Parmelia subdecipiens Vain.
Parmelia subflabellata Steiner.
Parmelia sublaevigata Nyl.
Parmelia subquercina Müll.Arg. 
Parmelia subrudecta Nyl. (1886) accepted as Punctelia subrudecta (Nyl.) Krog (1982)
Parmelia subschenckiana Gyeln. 
Parmelia subsinuosa Nyl. 
Parmelia suffixa Stirt. 
Parmelia synestia Stirt. 
Parmelia terricola Steiner & Zahlbr.
Parmelia texana Tuck. 
Parmelia thamnidiella Stirt. 
Parmelia tiliacea Ach. 
Parmelia tiliacea var. rimulosa Müll.Arg. 
Parmelia tiliacea var. revoluta Krempelh. 
Parmelia tiliacea var. scortea Ducy. 
Parmelia tinctoria var. hypomecha Ach. 
Parmelia tinctorum Despr.
Parmelia tortuosa Ach. 
Parmelia toxodes Stirt. (1878) accepted as Punctelia toxodes (Stirt.) Kalb & M.Götz (2007)
Parmelia vanderbylii Zahlbr. 
Parmelia verruculifera Nyl.
Parmelia worcesteri Steiner & Zahlbr.
Parmelia xanthotropa Stirt.
Parmelia zambesica Müll.Arg.
Parmelia zollingeri Hepp (1854) accepted as Parmotrema zollingeri (Hepp) Hale (1974)

Family: Parmeliaceae (Lichens)

Genus: Parmeliella (Lichens)
Parmeliella coelistina Zahlbr. 
Parmeliella corallinoides Zahlbr. 
Parmeliella plumbea Müll.Arg. accepted as Degelia plumbea (Lightf.) P.M.Jørg. & P.James (1990)

Genus: Parmentaria 
Parmentaria capensis Zahlbr.

Genus: Parmotrema (Lichens)
Parmotrema perforata Massal.

Genus: Parodiella
Parodiella brachystegiae P.Henn.
Parodiella circinata Sacc.
Parodiella congregata Syd.
Parodiella grammodes Cooke
Parodiella paraguayensis Speg.
Parodiella perisporioides Speg. 
Parodiella perisporoiodes var. microspora Theiss. & Syd.
Parodiella puucta Sacc.
Parodiella schimperi P.Henn.
 
Family: Parodiellinaceae

Family: Parodiellineae

Genus: Parodiellinopsis
Parodiellinopsis transvaalensis Hansf.

Family: Parodiopsidineae

Genus: Parodiopsis
Parodiopsis brachystegiae Am.

Genus: Passalora
Passalora protearum Kalchbr. & Cooke

Genus: Patella
Patella albida Seaver.
Patella coprinaria Seaver.
Patella lusatiae Seaver.
Patella scutellata Morg.

Genus: Patellaria
Patellaria atrata Fr.
Patellaria incamata Ach. 
Patellaria leprolyta Müll.Arg.
 
Family: Patellariaceae

Genus: Patouillardia
Patouillardia rumicis Verw. & du Pless.

Genus: Paxillus
Paxillus atraetopus Kalchbr.
Paxillus extenuatus Fr.
Paxillus involutus Fr.
Paxillus panuoides Fr. accepted as Tapinella panuoides (Batsch) E.-J.Gilbert (1931)

Pe
Genus: Peccania
Peccania minuscula Zahlbr. 

Genus: Peltigera (Lichens)
Peltigera canina Willd. 
Peltigera canina f. leucorrhiza Floerke. 
Peltigera canina f. membranacea Duby. 
Peltigera ceranoides Spreng. 
Peltigera malacea Funck. 
Peltigera membranacea Nyl. 
Peltigera polydactyla Hoffm. 
Peltigera polydactyla f. hymenina Flotow. 

Family:Peltigeraceae (Lichens)

Genus: Penicillium
Penicillium acidoferum Sopp. 
Penicillium adametzi Zal. 
Penicillium brevi-compactum Dierckx. 
Penicillium citrinum Thom. 
Penicillium coryphilum Dierckx. 
Penicillium cyclopium Westling, (1911), accepted as Penicillium aurantiogriseum Dierckx, (1901) 
Penicillium digitatum Sacc. 
Penicillium digitatum var. californicum Thom 
Penicillium divaricatum Thom 
Penicillium duclauxii Delacr. 
Penicillium elongatum Dierckx. accepted as Penicillium rugulosum Thom, C. 1910
Penicillium expansum Link emend. Thom
Penicillium funiculosum Thom. 
Penicillium gilmanii Thom accepted as Penicillium restrictum Gilman, J.C.; Abbott, E.V. 1927
Penicillium gladioli Machacek. 
Penicillium glaucum Link. 
Penicillium gratioti Sartory. 
Penicillium guttulosum Abbott. accepted as Penicillium simplicissimum Thom, C. 1930 
Penicillium hagemi K.M. Zalessky (1927), accepted as Penicillium brevicompactum Dierckx, 1901 
Penicillium intricatum Thom. acceptes as Penicillium westlingii Zalessky, K.M. 1927
Penicillium italicum Wehm. 
Penicillium janthinellum Biourge.  accepted as Penicillium simplicissimum Thom, C. 1930 
Penicillium lanosum Westling. accepted as Penicillium kojigenum Smith, G. 1961
Penicillium luteo-viride Biourge. 
Penicillium luteum Zukal. 
Penicillium luteum (series). 
Penicillium notatum Westling. accepted as Penicillium chrysogenum Thom (1910)
Penicillium oxalicum Currie & Thom. 
Penicillium palitans Westling. 
Penicillium petchii Sartory & Bain. 
Penicillium pinophilum Hedgcock. 
Penicillium purpurogenum Stoll. 
Penicillium putterillii Thom 
Penicillium roqueforti Thom 
Penicillium roseo-citrinum Biourge. 
Penicillium roseum Link. accepted as  Clonostachys rosea f. rosea (Link) Schroers, (1999)
Penicillium rugulosum var. aureomarginatum 
Penicillium simplicissimum Thom. 
Penicillium solitum Westling. 
Penicillium tardum Thom 
Penicillium verrucosum Dierckx. 
Penicillium viridicatum (series). 
Penicillium sp. 

Genus: Peniophora
Peniophora arenata Talbot. 
Peniophora atrocinerea Mass. 
Peniophora camosa Burt. 
Peniophora cinerea Cooke. 
Peniophora cremea Sacc. & Syd. 
Peniophora gigantea Mass. 
Peniophora glebulosa Sacc. & Syd. 
Peniophora incarnata Karst.
Peniophora nuda Bres. 
Peniophora papyrina Cooke. 
Peniophora pruinata Burt. 
Peniophora purpurea Lloyd. 
Peniophora roumeguerii Bres. 
Peniophora setigera Bres. ex Bourd & Galz. 
Peniophora velutina (DC.) Cooke (1879) accepted as Phanerochaete velutina (DC.) Parmasto (1968)

Genus: Penzigia
Penzigia discolor Miller. 
Penzigia verrucosa Miller. 

Genus: Perichaena
Perichaena corticalis Rost. 
Perichaena depressa Libert. 
Perichaena populina Fr. 

Genus: Periconia
Periconia doidgeae Hansf. 
Periconia pycnospora Fres. 
Periconia velutina Wint. 

Genus: Periconiella
Periconiella velutina Sacc.

Genus: Perischizon
Perischizon oleifolium Syd.

Genus: Perisporina
Perisporina melioliicola Doidge

Genus: Perisporium
Perisporium irenicolum Doidge

Genus: Peroneutypella
Peroneutypella cylindrica Berl. 
Peroneutypella infinitissima Doidge

Genus: Peronoplasmopora
Peronoplasmopora cubensis Clint.

Genus: Pertusaria (Lichens)
Pertusaria alpina Hepp. 
Pertusaria amara Nyl. 
Pertusaria amara var. capensis Steiner. 
Pertusaria ambigens Tuck. 
Pertusaria aperta Stizenb. 
Pertusaria casta Zahlbr. 
Pertusaria ceuthocarpa Fr. 
Pertusaria coccodes Nyl. 
Pertusaria commutans Vain. 
Pertusaria coriacea Th.Fr. var. obducens Zahlbr. 
Pertusaria cryptostoma Müll.Arg. 
Pertusaria diaziana Massal. 
Pertusaria dispersa Vain. 
Pertusaria duplicata Wain. 
Pertusaria elatior Stirt. 
Pertusaria enterostigmoides Zahlbr. 
Pertusaria euglypta Tuck. 
Pertusaria eyelpistia Massal. 
Pertusaria flavens Nyl. 
Pertusaria flavicunda Tuck. 
Pertusaria granulata Müll.Arg. 
Pertusaria granulata var. variolarioides Flotow. 
Pertusaria inquinata Th.Fr. 
Pertusaria laevigata Am 
Pertusaria laevigata var. laevigata Steiner. 
Pertusaria leioplaca DC. 
Pertusaria leioplaca var. octospora Nyl. 
Pertusaria leioplaca var. pycnocarpa Nyl
Pertusaria leioplaca var. trypetheliiformis Nyl 
Pertusaria leioplaeella Nyl. 
Pertusaria leonina Stizenb. 
Pertusaria leucosoroides Nyl. 
Pertusaria limosa Zahlbr. 
Pertusaria mamillana Müll.Arg. 
Pertusaria melaleuca Duby. 
Pertusaria melanospora Nyl.
Pertusaria microthelia Wain. 
Pertusaria multiplicans Vain. 
Pertusaria nivea Merrill. 
Pertusaria obducens Nyl. 
Pertusaria orbiculata Zahlbr. 
Pertusaria pustulata Duby. 
Pertusaria rhodesica Vain. 
Pertusaria spaniostoma Vain. 
Pertusaria subdealbata Nyl. 
Pertusaria subvelatula Vain. 
Pertusaria thiostoma Nyl. 
Pertusaria tropica Wain. 
Pertusaria trypetheliiformis Nyl. 
Pertusaria variolosa Müll.Arg. 
Pertusaria velata Nyl. 
Pertusaria vepallida Nyl. 
Pertusaria verrucosa Fee f. oligopyrena Wallr. 
Pertusaria wawreana Massal. 
Pertusaria wawreanoides Nyl. 
Pertusaria wilmsii Stizenb. 
Pertusaria xanthomelaena Müll.Arg. 
Pertusaria xanthothelia Müll.Arg.

Family: Pertusariaceae (lichens)

Genus: Pestalotia
Pestalotia aloes Trinch. 
Pestalotia burchelliae Laughton. 
Pestalotia caffra Syd. 
Pestalotia camelliae Pass. 
Pestalotia cassinis Laughton. 
Pestalotia disseminata Thuem. 
Pestalotia encephalartos Laughton. 
Pestalotia evansii P.Henn. 
Pestalotia funerea Desm. 
Pestalotia oossypii Hori. 
Pestalotia guepini Desm.
Pestalotia laughtonae Doidge. 
Pestalotia laurophvlli Laughton. 
Pestalotia maerochaeta Guva. 
Pestalotia mangiferae  Henn., (1907), accepted as Pestalotiopsis mangiferae (Henn.) Steyaert, (1949)
Pestalotia micheneri Guva. accepted as Pestalotiopsis microspora (Speg.) G.C. Zhao & N. Li
Pestalotia milletiae Laughton. 
Pestalotia neglecta Thuem. 
Pestalotia ocoteae Laughton. 
Pestalotia palmarum Cooke (1876), accepted as Pestalotiopsis palmarum (Cooke) Steyaert, (1949)
Pestalotia pelargonii Laughton
Pestalotia peregrina Ell. & Mart. 
Pestalotia podocarpi Laughton
Pestalotia psidii Pat.
Pestalotia pterocelastri Laughton
Pestalotia quercina Guba. 
Pestalotia rapaneae Laughton
Pestalotia theae Shaw. (sic} possibly Sawada, (1915) accepted as Pseudopestalotiopsis theae (Sawada) Maharachch., K.D. Hyde & Crous, in Maharachchikumbura, Hyde, Groenewald, Xu & Crous, (2014)
Pestalotia trichocladi Laughton
Pestalotia versicolor Speg., (1879), accepted as Pestalotiopsis versicolor (Speg.) Steyaert, (1949)
Pestalotia virgatula Kleb. 
Pestalotia watsoniae Verw. & Dipp. 
Pestalotia zahlbruckneriana P.Henn. 
Pestalotia sp.

Pestalozzia, see Pestalotia

Peyritschiellaceae

Genus: Peziza
Peziza abietina Pers.
Peziza africana v.d.Byl. 
Peziza aluticolor Berk. 
Peziza calyculaeformis Schum. 
Peziza cinerea Batsch ex Fr. 
Peziza coccinea Jacq. 
Peziza columbina Kalchbr. & Cooke
Peziza cupularis Linn. 
Peziza cypliellum Kalchbr.
Peziza epitricha Berk 
Peziza ferruginea Fr. 
Peziza lachnoderma Berk. 
Peziza Lusatiae Cooke
Peziza nilgherrensis Cooke
Peziza repanda Pers. 
Peziza rubella Pers. 
Peziza vesiculosa Bull.

Family: Pezizaceae

Order: Pezizales

Ph
Family: Phacidiaceae

Order: Phacidiales

Genus: Phacidium
Phacidium litigiosum Desm. 
Phacidium nitidum Welw. & Curr.
 
Genus: Phaeochorella
Phaeochorella parinarii Theiss. & Syd.

Genus: Phaeodimeriella
Phaeodimeriella asterinarum Theiss. 
Phaeodimeriella asterinicola Doidge
Phaeodimeriella capensis Doidge
Phaeodimeriella grewiae Hansf. 
Phaeodimeriella parvulum Hansf. 
Phaeodimeriella plumbea Doidge
Phaeodimeriella psilostomatis Theiss.

Genus: Phaeodothis
Phaeodothis lebeckiae Nel.
Phaeodothis stenostoma Theiss. & Syd. 
Phaeodothis tristachyae Syd.

Genus: Phaeographina (lichens)
Phaeographina caesiopruinosa Müll.Arg. 
Phaeographina limbata Müll.Arg. 
Phaeographina subfarinacea Zahlbr.

Genus: Phaeographis (lichens)
Phaeographis conjungens Aahlbr. 
Phaeographis cryptica Zahlbr. 
Phaeographis inusta Müll.Arg. 
Phaeographis mesographa Müll.Arg.
 
Genus: Phaeophragmeriella
Phaeophragmeriella meliolae Hansf. 
Phaeophragmeriella irenicola Hansf. 
Phaeophragmeriella transvaalensis Hansf.

Genus: Phaeospherella
Phaeospherella eongregata Doidge
Phaeospherella prinarii Theiss. & Syd.
Phaeospherella senniana Sacc.

Genus: Phaeostigme
Phaeostigme circumsedens Doidge

Family: Phallaceae
 
Order: Phallales
 
Genus: Phallus
Phallus aurantiacus Mont. 
Phallus aurantiacus var. gracilis Fisch. 
Phallus campanulatus Berk. 
Phallus gracilis Lloyd. 
Phallus impudicus Linn, ex Pers.
Phallus indusiatus Vent, ex Pers. 
Phallus rubicundus Fr.
Phallus rugulosus Lloyd
Phallus tunicatus Schlecht.

Genus: Pharcidia
Pharcidia psorae Wint.

Genus: Phellorina
Phellorina delastrei Ed.Fisch.
Phellorina inquinans Berk.
Phellorina squamosa Kalchbr. & MacOwan
Phellorina strobilina Kalchbr.

Genus: Phillipsia
Phillipsia domingensis Berk. 
Phillipsia kermesina Kalchbr. & Cooke

Genus: Philonectria
Philonectria ugandensis Hansf.

Genus: Phlebia
Phlebia strigoso-zonata Lloyd

Genus: Phlebopus
Phlebopus capensis Sing.

Genus: Phlyctella
Phlyctella andensis Nyl. 
Phlyctella capillaris Stizenb.

Genus: Phlyctidia
Phlyctidia boliviensis Müll.Arg.

Genus: Phlyctis (lichens)
Phlyctis argena Flotow. 
Phlyctis boliviensis Nyl. 
Phlyctis candida Zahlbr.
Phlyctis capillaris Stirt.

Genus: Pholiota
Pholiota aurivella Quel.
Pholiota cylindracea Gill.
Pholiota dura Quel.
Pholiota flammans Quel.
Pholiota mutabilis Quel. (sic) could be (Schaeff.) P.Kumm. (1871),accepted as Kuehneromyces mutabilis (Schaeff.) Singer & A.H.Sm. (1946)
Pholiota mycenoides Quel.
Pholiota spectabilis Quel.
Pholiota togularis Quel.
Pholiota unicolor Gill.

Genus: Phoma
Phoma agapanthi Sacc.
Phoma ampelinum de Bary.
Phoma artemisiae Kalchbr. & Cooke
Phoma betae A.B. Frank, (1892), accepted as Pleospora betae Björl., (1915)
Phoma brassicae Sacc.
Phoma caricina Hopkins.
Phoma citricarpa McAlpine, (1899), accepted as Guignardia citricarpa Kiely, (1948)
Phoma cyclospora Sacc.
Phoma destructiva Plowr.
Phoma fici-caricae Verw. & du Pless.
Phoma flaccida McAlp.
Phoma gaillardiae du Pless.
Phoma geasteropsidis Hollos.
Phoma glumarum Ell. & Tracy.
Phoma insidiosa Tassi.
Phoma lantanae Verw. & du Pless.
Phoma lingam (Tode) Desm. (1849), accepted as  Leptosphaeria maculans (Sowerby) P.Karst. 1873
Phoma macrothecia Thuem.
Phoma oleracea Sacc.
Phoma omithogali Thuem.
Phoma passiflorae Penz. & Sacc.
Phoma persicae Sacc.
Phoma pinastrella Sacc.
Phoma pomi Pass.(sic), maybe Schulzer & Sacc. (1884), accepted as Mycosphaerella pomi (Pass.) Lindau, (1897)
Phoma rostrupii Sacc. (1895),accepted as Leptosphaeria libanotis (Fuckel) Niessl (1876)
Phoma sanguinolenta Rostr.accepted as Plenodomus libanotidis (Fuckel) Gruyter, Aveskamp & Verkley, in Gruyter, Woudenberg, Aveskamp, Verkley, Groenewald & Crous 2012
Phoma stapeliae Kalchbr. & Cooke
Phoma straminella
Phoma subcircinata Ellis & Everh. (1893), accepted as Phomopsis phaseoli (Desm.) Sacc., (1915)
Phoma tatulae Kalchbr. & Cooke
Phoma terrestris H.N. Hansen, (1929),accepted as Pyrenochaeta terrestris (H.N. Hansen) Gorenz, J.C. Walker & Larson, (1948)
Phoma tingens Cooke & Mass.
Phoma welwitschiae Mass.
Phoma zantedeschiae Dipp.
Phoma sp.

Genus: Phomopsis
Phomopsis cinerescens Trav.
Phomopsis citri H.S. Fawc. (1912), accepted as Diaporthe citri F.A. Wolf
Phomopsis daturae Sacc.
Phomopsis juniperovora Hahn.
Phomopsis mali  Roberts (1912), accepted as Phomopsis prunorum (Cooke) Grove, (1917)
Phomopsis oxalina Syd.
Phomopsis papayae Frag. & Cif.
Phomopsis perniciosa Grove.
Phomopsis phaseolorum Grove.
Phomopsis samarorum v.Hohn.
Phomopsis sp.

Genus: Phragmidium
Phragmidium albidum Ludw.(sic) possibly (J.G. Kühn) Lagerh. (1888)accepted as Kuehneola uredinis (Link) Arthur (1906)
Phragmidium disciflorum James.
Phragmidium longissimum Thuem.
Phragmidium obtusum Tul.
Phragmidium rosarum Fuckel, (1870), accepted as Phragmidium mucronatum (Pers.) Schltdl., (1824)
Phragmidium subcorticium (Schrank) G. Winter, (1882), accepted as Phragmidium mucronatum (Pers.) Schltdl., (1824)
Phragmidium violaceum Wint.

Genus: Phragmoeauma
Phragmoeauma viventis Theiss. & Syd.

Genus: Phragmodothella
Phragmodothella nervisequens Doidge

Genus: Phragmodothis
Phragmodothis asperata Syd.

Genus: Phragmosperma
Phragmosperma marattiae Theiss. & Syd.

Genus: Phragmothyriella
Phragmothyriella parenchymatica Doidge

Genus: Phragmothyrium
Phragmothyrium trichamanis v.Hohn.

Genus: Phycopsis
Phycopsis africana Syd.

Genus: Phyllachora
Phyllachora aberiae P.Henn.
Phyllachora albizziae Cooke
Phyllachora amaniensis P.Henn.
Phyllachora anthistiriicola Syd.
Phyllachora arundinellae Doidge.
Phyllachora baumii P.Henn.
Phyllachora bottomleyae Doidge
Phyllachora brachypodii Roum. (1885),accepted as Phyllachora graminis (Pers.) Fuckel, (1870)
Phyllachora brachystegiae Doidge
Phyllachora burgessiae Doidge
Phyllachora caffra Syd.
Phyllachora capensis Doidge
Phyllachora chloridicola Speg.
Phyllachora chrysopogonis Syd.
Phyllachora circinata Theiss. & Syd.
Phyllachora crotonis Sacc.
Phyllachora cynodontis Niessl.
Phyllachora cynodontis var. chloridis P.Henn 
Phyllachora digitariae Syd.
Phyllachora digitaricola Doidge.
Phyllachora doidgeae Syd.
Phyllachora dombeyae Syd.
Phyllachora elyonuri Doidge.
Phyllachora eragrostidicola Doidge
Phyllachora eragrostidis Doidge
Phyllachora evansii Syd.
Phyllachora ficuum Niessl.
Phyllachora gentilis Speg.
Phyllachora goyazensis P.Henn.
Phyllachora graminis Pers. (sic) (Pers.) Fuckel, (1870),
Phyllachora grammica P.Henn.
Phyllachora grewiae Theiss. & Syd.
Phyllachora halsei Doidge.
Phyllachora heterospora P.Henn.
Phyllachora hieronymi P.Henn.
Phyllachora howardiana Petrsk.
Phyllachora kniphofiae Sacc.
Phyllachora leptocarydii Syd.
Phyllachora lessertiae Doidge.
Phyllachora loudetiae Doidge.
Phyllachora lucens Sacc.
Phyllachora melianthi Sacc.
Phyllachora melinicola Syd.
Phyllachora microstegia Syd.
Phyllachora minuta P.Henn.
Phyllachora miscanthidii Doidge.
Phyllachora morganae Doidge
Phyllachora myrsinicola Doidge
Phyllachora nervisequens Petrak.
Phyllachora osyridis Cooke
Phyllachora peglerae Doidge
Phyllachora peltophori Syd.
Phyllachora penniseti Syd.
Phyllachora permutata Petrak.
Phyllachora perotidis Doidge.
Phyllachora plaeida Theiss.
Phyllachora pretoriae Doidge.
Phyllachora proteae Wakef.
Phyllachora pterocarpi Syd.
Phyllachora puncta Doidge
Phyllachora repens Sacc.
Phyllachora rikatliensis Petrak.
Phyllachora sanguinolenta Theiss. & Syd.
Phyllachora sanguinolenta var. microspora Syd.
Phyllachora schizachyrii Doidge.
Phyllachora schotiae Doidge.
Phyllachora strelitziae Sacc. emend. Doidge 
Phyllachora striatula Theiss. & Syd.
Phyllachora superba Doidge.
Phyllachora tecleae Doidge.
Phyllachora tephrosiae Syd.
Phyllachora transvaalensis Doidge.
Phyllachora tricholaenae P.Henn.
Phyllachora winkleri Syd.
Phyllachora woodiana Doidge.
Phyllachora sp.

Family: Phyllachoraceae

Genus: Phyllachorella
Phyllachorella rikatliensis Doidge

Genus: Phyllactinia
Phyllactinia acaciae Syd.
Phyllactinia combreti Doidge.
Phyllactinia eorylea Karst.
Phyllactinia erythrinae Doidge.
Phyllactinia evansii Doidge.
Phyllactinia rhoina Doidge.
Phyllactinia sphenostylidis Doidge

Genus: Phyllopsora (lichens)
Phyllopsora breviuscula Müll.Arg.
Phyllopsora corallina Müll.Arg.
Phyllopsora parvifolia Müll.Arg.
Phyllopsora parvifolia var. fibrillifera Müll.Arg.
Phyllopsora parvifolia var. pulvinata Steiner.
Phyllopsora parvifoliella Müll.Arg.

Family: Phyllopsoraceae

Genus: Phyllosticta
Phyllosticta aloes Kalchbr.
Phyllosticta antirrhini Syd.
Phyllosticta asplenii Jaap.
Phyllosticta auriculata Kalchbr. & Cooke.
Phyllosticta bauhiniae-reticulatae P.Henn. 
Phyllosticta begoniae Brun.
Phyllosticta betae Oudem., (1877), accepted as Pleospora betae Björl., (1915)
Phyllosticta brassicae West. accepted as Leptosphaeria maculans (Sowerby) P.Karst. 1873
Phyllosticta canavaliae v.d.Byl
Phyllosticta caricae-papayae Alleseh.
Phyllosticta carissae Kalchbr. & Cooke
Phyllosticta cepae Verw. & du Pless.
Phyllosticta cephalariae Wint.
Phyllosticta colae Verw. & du Pless.
Phyllosticta degenerans Syd.
Phyllosticta delphinii Clem.
Phyllosticta dianthi West.
Phyllosticta dioscoreae Cooke.
Phyllosticta doxanthae Verw. & du Pless.
Phyllosticta dryopteris Verw. & du Pless.
Phyllosticta eriobotrvae Thuem.
Phyllosticta ficicola Pat.
Phyllosticta gossypina Ell. & Mart.
Phyllosticta helvola Tassi.
Phyllosticta hesperidearum Penz.
Phyllosticta hibiscina Ell. & Everth.
Phyllosticta idaecola Cooke.
Phyllosticta latospora Verw. & du Pless.
Phyllosticta magnoliae Saec.
Phyllosticta mali  Prill. & Delacr., (1890), accepted as Mycosphaerella pomi (Pass.) Lindau, (1897)
Phyllosticta malkoffii Bubak.
Phyllosticta medicaginis Sacc.
Phyllosticta nemophilae Dipp.
Phyllosticta nepenthecearum Tassi.
Phyllosticta nicotianae Ell. & Everh.
Phyllosticta odinae P.Henn. & Evans.
Phyllosticta orbicularis Ell. & Everh.
Phyllosticta owaniana Wint.
Phyllosticta perseae Ell. & Mart.
Phyllosticta persicae Sacc.
Phyllosticta phaseolina Sacc.
Phyllosticta prunicola Sacc.
Phyllosticta psidii Tassi.
Phyllosticta pyrina Sacc.
Phyllosticta rhoina Kalchbr. & Cooke.
Phyllosticta richardiae Halst.
Phyllosticta rumicis Kalchbr.
Phyllosticta solitaria Ell. & Everh.
Phyllosticta sorghina Sacc. accepted as Leptosphaeria sacchari Breda de Haan, (1892)
Phyllosticta stanhopiae Alleseh.
Phyllosticta straminella Bres.
Phyllosticta tabaci Pass.
Phyllosticta terminaliae P.Henn.
Phyllosticta theobromae Aim. & Cam.
Phyllosticta violae Desm.
Phyllosticta sp.

Genus: Phyllostictina
Phyllostictina concentrica v.Hohn. var. lusitanica J.V. Almeida, (1903), accpted as Phyllosticta concentrica Sacc., (1876)

Genus: Physalospora
Physalospora bersamae Syd.
Physalospora bylii du Pless.
Physalospora caffra Syd.
Physalospora chaenostoma Sacc.
Physalospora cliviae Syd.
Physalospora cydoniae  G. Arnaud, (1911)accepted as Peyronellaea obtusa (Fuckel) Aveskamp, Gruyter & Verkley, in Aveskamp, Gruyter, Woudenberg, Verkley & Crous, (2010)
Physalospora dombeyae Syd.
Physalospora malorum Shear, N.E. Stevens & Wilcox, (1924)accepted as Peyronellaea obtusa (Fuckel) Aveskamp, Gruyter & Verkley, in Aveskamp, Gruyter, Woudenberg, Verkley & Crous, (2010)
Physalospora obtusa  (Schwein.) Cooke, (1892), accepted as Peyronellaea obtusa (Fuckel) Aveskamp, Gruyter & Verkley, in Aveskamp, Gruyter, Woudenberg, Verkley & Crous, (2010)
Physalospora perseae Doidge.
Physalospora placida Syd.
Physalospora sapii Doidge.

Genus: Physalosporina
Physalosporina sutherlandiae Petrak.

Genus: Physarella 
Physarella oblonga Morg.

Genus:Physcia
Physcia adglutinata Nyl.
Physcia adglutinata var. pyrithrocardia Müll.Arg.
Physcia adscendens Oliv.
Physcia aegiliata Nyl.
Physcia affixa Nyl.
Physcia africana Müll.Arg.
Physcia aipolia Hampe.
Physcia aipolia var. acrita Hue.
Physcia aipolia var. alnophila Vain.
Physcia applanata Zahlbr.
Physcia astroidea Nyl.
Physcia eaesia Hampe.
Physcia capensis deNot.
Physcia chrysopkthalma DC.
Physcia chrysophthalma var. capensis Nyl.
Physcia chrysophthalma var. dijatata Stizenb.
Physcia chrysopkthalma var. pubera Nyl.
Physcia clementiana Kickx.
Physcia confluens Nyl.
Physcia crispa Nyl.
Physcia crispa f. melanothalma Wain.
Physcia dilatata Nyl.
Physcia dimidiata Nyl.
Physcia ectanoides Nyl.
Physcia endoohrysea Hampe.
Physcia endococcinea Nyl.
Physcia erythrocardia Vain.
Physcia exilis Michx.
Physcia fibrosa Nyl.
Physcia flammea Nyl.
Physcia flammula Nyl.
Physcia flavicans DC.
Physcia flavicans var. exilis Nyl.
Physcia flavicans var. minor Cromb.
Physcia flavicans var. crocea Jatta.
Physcia hispida Frege.
Physcia holoxantha Nyl.
Physcia hypoglauca Nyl.
Physcia hypoleuca Tuck.
Physcia hypoleuca var. granulifera Hue.
Physcia integrata Nyl.
Physcia integrata var. obsessa Vain.
Physcia leucomela Michx.
Physcia leucomela var. angustifolia Nyl.
Physcia leicomela var. subcomosa Nyl.
Physcia lychnea Nyl. var. semigranularis Stizenb.
Physcia macryphylla Stizenb.
Physcia melanocarpoides Vain.
Physcia obesa Pers. f. caesiocrocata Nyl.
Physcia obesa f. tenuior Stizenb.
Physcia obscura Hampe.
Physcia obscura var. chloantha Rabenh.
Physcia obscura var. glaucovirens Zahlbr.
Physcia ochroleuca Müll.Arg.
Physcia parietina deNot.
Physcia parietina f. albicans Müll.Arg.
Physcia parietina var. aureola Korb.
Physcia parietina var. ectanea Nyl.
Physcia parietina var. rutilans Stizenb.
Physcia perrugosa Stizenb.
Physcia picta Nyl.
Physcia picta f. erythrocardia Stizenb.
Physcia picta f. isidiifera Nyl.
Physcia picta var. erythrocardia Tuck.
Physcia picta var. sorediata Müll.Arg.
Physcia podocarpa Nyl.
Physcia pulverulenta Hampe.
Physcia pusilla Massal.
Physcia setosa Nyl.
Physcia setosa f. deminuta Cromb.
Physcia setosa f. virella B.de Lesd.
Physcia speciosa Nyl.
Physcia speciosa var. dactyliza Nyl.
Physcia speciosa var. granulifera Tuck.
Physcia speciosa var. hypoleuca Nyl.
Physcia stellaris Nyl. 
Physcia stellaris var. aipolia f. acrita Nyl.
Physcia subpicta Nyl.
Physcia syncolla Nyl.
Physcia tenella DC.
Physcia tribacoides Nyl.
Physcia venustula Stizenb.
Physcia villosa Duby.
Physcia zuluensis Vain.

Family: Physeiaceae

Genus: Physma
Physma byrsinum Müll.Arg.
Physma calliearpum Hue.

Genus: Physoderma
Physoderma maydis Miyabe.
Physoderma zeae-maydis Shaw.

Genus: Physopella
Physopella fici Arth.

Genus: Physospora
Physospora rubiginosa Fr.

Genus: Phytophthora
Phytophthora cactorum Schroet.
Phytophthora citricola Sawada.
Phytophthora cambivora Petri.
Phytophthora cinnamomi Rands.
Phytophthora citrophthora Leon.
Phytophthora cryptogea Pethybr. & Lalf.
Phytophthora hibernalis Came. 
Phytophthora infestans de Bary.
Phytophthora parasitica Dast.accepted as Phytophthora nicotianae Breda de Haan, (1896)
Phytophthora parasitica var. rhei  G.H.Godfrey, 1923,accepted as Phytophthora nicotianae Breda de Haan, (1896)
Phytophthora syringae Kleb.

Pi
Genus: Piggotia
Piggotia filicina Thuem.

Genus: Pilidium
Pilidium eucleae Kalchbr. & Cooke.

Genus: Piline
Piline africana Syd.

Family: Pilobolaceae

Genus: Pilobolus
Pilobolus crystallinus Tode.

Family: Pilocarpaceae (Lichens)

Genus: Pilocarpon
Pilocarpon leucoblepharum Wain. f. confluens Wain.

Genus: Pilophoron
Pilophoron aciculare Nyl.

Genus: Pilula
Pilula straminea Mass.

Family: Piptocephalaceae

Genus: Piricularia
Piricularia oryzae Br. & Cav.

Genus: Pisolithus
Pisolithus tinctorius  (Pers.) Coker & Couch (1928), accepted as Pisolithus arhizus (Scop.) Rauschert (1959)

Pl

Genus: Placosterella
Placosterella rehmii Theiss. & Syd.

Genus: Placodium
Placodium acaciae Vain.
Placodium benguellense Wain.
Placodium cinnabarinum Nyl.
Placodium deminutum Müll.Arg.
Placodium domingense Vain.
Placodium elcgans DC.
Placodium elegantissimum Vain.
Placodium ferrugineovirens Vain.
Placodium ferrugineum Hepp var. benguellensis Wain. 
Placodium ferrugineum var. miniaceum Tuck. 
Placodium ferrugineum var. pyrithromoides Vain.
Placodium flavidulum Vain.
Placodium flavorubens Nyl.
Placodium leptopismum Vain.
Placodium leptopismum f. discreta Vain.
Placodium mastophorum Vain.
Placodium perexiguum Müll.Arg.
Placodium perexiguum Vain.
Placodium poloterum Vain.
Placodium psorothecioides Vain.
Placodium punicae Vain.
Placodium pyropoecilium Vain.
Placodium scoriophilum Massal.
Placodium sophodes Vain.
Placodium subcerinum Vain.
Placodium subranulosum Wain.
Placodium sympageellum Vain.
Placodium testacea-rufum Vain.
Placodium thaeodes Müll.Arg.
Placodium xanthophanum Müll.Arg.

Genus: Placynthiopsis (lichens)
Placynthiopsis africana Zahlbr.
 
Genus: Plasmodiophora (cercozoa)
Plasmodiophora brassicae Woronin, 1877,
 
Fanily: Plasmodiophoraceae

Genus: Plasmopora
Plasmopora viticola Berl. & de Toni

Genus: Platygrapha (lichens)
Platygrapha dirinea Nyl.
Platygrapha septenaria Stizenb.
 
Genus: Plectania
Plectania coccinea Puck.
Plectania occidentalis Seaver.

Genus: Plectodiscella
Plectodiscella veneta Burkh.

Genus: Pleiostomella
Pleiostomella Halleriae Doidge

Genus: Pleomassaria
Pleomassaria gigantea Syd.
Pleomassaria grandis Syd.
Pleomassaria peddieae Doidge

Genus: Pleonectria
Pleonectria pseudotrichia (Schwein.) Wollenw. (1926) accepted as Nectria pseudotrichia (Schwein.) Berk. & M.A. Curtis, (1853)

Genus: Pleoravenelia
Pleoravenelia deformans Maubl.

Genus: Pleospora
Pleospora bilbergiae Verw. & du Pless.
Pleospora camelliae Dipp.
Pleospora dianthi de Not.
Pleospora disrupta McAlp.
Pleospora doidgeae Petdak.
Pleospora dyeri Doidge.
Pleospora gerberae Dipp.
Pleospora gramineum Died.
Pleospora herbarum Rabenh.
Pleospora kentiae Maubl.
Pleospora lanceolata Sacc.
Pleospora ozyzae Catt.
Pleospora refracta Sace.
Pleospora tropaeoli Halst.
Pleospora vulgatissima Speg.

Genus: Pleurage
Pleurage Brassicae Kuntze.

Genus: Pleurotrema
Pleurotrema trichosporum Müll.Arg.

Genus: Pleurotus
Pleurotus applicatus Quel.
Pleurotus atrocaeruleus Gill.
Pleurotus aureo-tomentosus Sacc.
Pleurotus eaveatus Sacc.
Pleurotus olusilis Sacc.
Pleurotus contrarius Sacc.
Pleurotus flabellatus Sacc.
Pleurotus gilvescens Sacc.
Pleurotus limpidus Gill.
Pleurotus olearius Gill.
Pleurotus ostreatus Quel.
Pleurotus perpusillus Gill.
Pleurotus petaloides Quel.
Pleurotus radiatim-plicatus Sacc.
Pleurotus rudis Pilat.
Pleurotus sciadium Sacc.
Pleurotus sciadeum var. salmoneus Sacc.
Pleurotus septicus Quel.
Pleurotus striatulus Quel.

Genus: Plicaria
Plicaria leiocarpa Curr.

Genus: Pluteolus
Pluteolus reticulatus Gill.

Genus: Pluteus
Pluteus cervinus Quel.
Pluteus pustulosus Killerm.

Po
Genus: Podaxis
Podaxis aegyptica Mont.
Podaxis carcinomalis Fr.
Podaxis indica Spreng.
Podaxis pistillaris Fr.
Podaxis aegypticus Mont.
Podaxis carcinomalis Fr.
Podaxis elatus Welw. & Curr.
Podaxis mossamedensis Welw. & Curr.
Podaxis pistillaris Fr.

Genus: Podocrea
Podocrea transvaalii Lloyd.

Genus: Podonectria
Podonectria coccicola Petch.

Genus: Podosphaera
Podosphaera leucotricha Salm.

Genus: Polyblastia (lichens)
Polyblastia alba Müll.Arg.
Polyblastia transvaalensis Müll.Arg.

Genus: Polyblastiopsis
Polyblastiopsis alba Zahlbr.
Polyblastiopsis transvaalensis Zahlbr.

Genus: Polycephalum
Polycephalum aurantiacum Kalchbr. & Cooke

Genus: Polyplocium
Polyplocium inquinans Berk.

Family: Polyporaceae

Family: Polyporoideae

Genus: Polyporus
Polyporus acaciae  Van der Byl, (1925), accepted as Schizopora flavipora (Berk. & M.A. Curtis ex Cooke) Ryvarden, (1985)
Polyporus adustus Fr.
Polyporus affinis Blume & T.Nees (1826), accepted as Microporus affinis (Blume & T.Nees) Kuntze (1898)
Polyporus anebus Berk.
Polyporus aneirinus Cooke (sic) possibly accepted as Oxyporus corticola (Fr.) Ryvarden, (1972)
Polyporus aratoides Lloyd
Polyporus aratus Berk.
Polyporus arcularius Fr.
Polyporus arenobasus Lloyd
Polyporus argenteofulvus v.d.Byl
Polyporus australiensis Wakef. accepted as Piptoporus australiensis (Wakef.) G. Cunn.
Polyporus australis Fr., (1828), accepted as Ganoderma tornatum (Pers.) Bres., (1912)
Polyporus baurii Kalchbr.
Polyporus biformis Kiotzsch.
Polyporus brumalis Fr.
Polyporus caesius Fr.
Polyporus callosus Fr.
Polyporus capensis Lloyd.
Polyporus carneo-fulvus Berk, ex Fr.
Polyporus carneo-pallens Berk.
Polyporus chilensis Fr.
Polyporus chioneus Fr. (1815), accepted as Tyromyces chioneus (Fr.) P.Karst. (1881)
Polyporus cinnabarinus Fr.
Polyporus cladonia Berk.
Polyporus clemensiae Sacc. & Trott.
Polyporus colossus Fr.
Polyporus conchatus Lloyd.
Polyporus conchoides Lloyd.
Polyporus confluens Fr.
Polyporus confragosus v.d.Byl.
Polyporus conjunctus Lloyd.
Polyporus corticola Fr. (1821), accepted as Oxyporus corticola (Fr.) Ryvarden, (1972)
Polyporus crispus Fr.
Polyporus cristatus Fr.
Polyporus cuticularis Fr.
Polyporus devians Bres.
Polyporus dichrous Fr. (1815),accepted as Gloeoporus dichrous (Fr.) Bres. (1912)
Polyporus dictyopus Mont.
Polyporus doidgeae Wakef.
Polyporus durbanensis v.d.Byl
Polyporus durus Jungh.
Polyporus elegans Fr.
Polyporus emerici Berk.
Polyporus epilinteus Berk. & Br.
Polyporus eylesii v.d.Byl
Polyporus favoloides P.Henn.
Polyporus ferruginosus Rostr.
Polyporus fiabelliformis Fr.
Polyporus flexilis v.d.Bylaccepted as Coriolopsis floccosa (Bull.) Murrill, (1903)
Polyporus focalis Kalchbr.
Polyporus fragilis Fr.
Polyporus fruticum Berk. & Curt.
Polyporus fumosus Fr.
Polyporus gallo-pavonis Berk. & Br.
Polyporus gibbosus Nees.
Polyporus gilvus Fr.
Polyporus glauco-effusus v.d.Byl.
Polyporus glaucoporus v.d.Byl.
Polyporus glirinus Kalchbr.
Polyporus goetzii P.Henn.
Polyporus grammocephalus Berk.
Polyporus helvolus (Fr.)
Polyporus heteroporus Fr.
Polyporus hirsutulus Schw.
Polyporus hirsutus (Wulfen) Fr. (1821),accepted as Trametes hirsuta (Wulfen) Lloyd (1924)
Polyporus hirtellus Fr.
Polyporus hispidus Fr. accepted as Inonotus hispidus (Bull.) P. Karst., (1880)
Polyporus iqniarius Linn, ex Fr. 
Polyporus immaculatus Lloyd.
Polyporus inconstans Kalehbr.
Polyporus intactilis Lloyd
Polyporus isidioides Berk.
Polyporus leoninus Klotzsch.
Polyporus livingstoniensis v.d.Byl accepted as Coriolopsis floccosa (Bull.) Murrill, (1903)
Polyporus lucidus Leyss. ex Fr.
Polyporus luteo-olivaceus Berk. & Br.
Polyporus luteus Blume & Nees.
Polyporus macowani Kalchbr.
Polyporus mastoporus Lev.
Polyporus megaloporus Mont.
Polyporus tncleagris Berk.
Polyporus mollicarnosus Lloyd
Polyporus molluscus Karst
Polyporus murinus Cooke
Polyporus nanus Mass.
Polyporus natalensis Fr.
Polyporus nidulans Fr.
Polyporus nigro-applanatus v.d.Byl
Polyporus nigrolucidus Lloyd
Polyporus occidentalis Klotzsch.
Polyporus ochraceus Pers.
Polyporus ochroleucus Berk.
Polyporus ochroporus v.d.Byl.
Polyporus osfreiformis Berk.
Polyporus pancheri Pat.
Polyporus patouillardi Theiss.
Polyporus pectunculus Lloyd.
Polyporus phocinus Berk. & Br.
Polyporus picipes Fr.
Polyporus pinsitus Fr.
Polyporus pocula Berk. & Curt.
Polyporus proteus Berk. accepted as Coriolopsis floccosa (Bull.) Murrill, (1903)
Polyporus proteus var. imbricatus Berk. accepted as Coriolopsis floccosa (Bull.) Murrill, (1903)
Polyporus pruinatus Klotzsch.
Polyporus pubeseens Schum. ex. Fr.
Polyporus raphanipes Wakef.
Polyporus reniformis Morgan.
Polyporus resinaceust Lloyd
Polyporus reticulatosporus v.d.Byl
Polyporus rheades Pers.
Polyporus rhipidius Berk
Polyporus robiniophila Lloyd
Polyporus rudis Lloyd (sic)
Polyporus rufescens Fr.
Polyporus rugulosus Lev.
Polyporus rusticus Lloydaccepted as Coriolopsis floccosa (Bull.) Murrill, (1903)
Polyporus sacer Fr.
Polyporus salisburiensis v.d.Byl
Polyporus sanguineus (L.) Fr. (1821), accepted as Pycnoporus sanguineus (L.) Murrill (1904)
Polyporus sanguinolentus Alb. Schw. ex Fr.
Polyporus schreuderi v.d.Byl
Polyporus schweinitzii Fr.
Polyporus scruposus Fr.
Polyporus sector Fr.accepted as Trichaptum sector (Ehrenb.) Kreisel (1971)
Polyporus spadiceus Jungh.
Polyporus subliberalus Berk. & Curt. 
Polyporus subpictilis v.d.Byl
Polyporus subradiatus Lloyd
Polyporus sulphureus (Bull.) Fr., (1821), accepted as Laetiporus sulphureus (Bull.) Murrill (1920)
Polyporus tabacinus Mont.
Polyporus telfairii Klotzsch.
Polyporus trabeus (Pers.) Rostk. (1830), accepted as Gloeophyllum trabeum (Pers.) Murrill (1908)
Polyporus transvaalensis v.d.Byl
Polyporus trichiliae Van der Byl, (1922), accepted as Schizopora flavipora (Berk. & M.A. Curtis ex Cooke) Ryvarden, (1985)
Polyporus umbraculum Fr.
Polyporus undatus Pers.
Polyporus undulatus Torrend.
Polyporus vallatus Berk.
Polyporus vaporarius Fr.
Polyporus varius Fr.
Polyporus veluticeps Cooke
Polyporus velutinosus Lloyd
Polyporus velutinus Pers. ex Fr.
Polyporus vernicipes Berk.
Polyporus versicolor (L.) Fr. (1821), accepted as Trametes versicolor (L.) Lloyd (1920)
Polyporus versiporus Pers.
Polyporus vibecinus Fr.
Polyporus vibecinus var. antilopum Kalchbr.
Polyporus vicinus Bres.
Polyporus vicinus Lloyd (1924), accepted as Vanderbylia vicina (Lloyd) D.A.Reid (1973)
Polyporus villosus sw. ex Fr.
Polyporus vinctus Berk. (1852),accepted as Rigidoporus vinctus (Berk.) Ryvarden (1972)
Polyporus vinosus Berk. (1852), accepted as Nigroporus vinosus (Berk.) Murrill (1905)
Polyporus virgatus Berk. & Curt.
Polyporus vittatus Berk.
Polyporus vulgaris Fr.
Polyporus xanthopus Fr.
Polyporus zambesianus Lloyd
Polyporus zonalus Fr.

Genus: Polyrhizon
Polyrhizon bewsii Doidge
Polyrhizon celastri Doidge
Polyrhizon pterocelastri Doidge

Genus: Polysaccum
Polysaccum crassipes DC.

Genus: Polystictus Fr. (1851)
Polystictus affinis Fr.
Polystictus affinis-concinnus Lloyd
Polystictus aratus Cooke
Polystictus argenteus Lloyd
Polystictus azureus Fr.
Polystictus baurii Cooke
Polystictus beharensis Cooke
Polystictus biformis Fr.
Polystictus bulbipes Fr.
Polystictus cinnabarinus Cooke
Polystictus circinatus Cooke
Polystictus coccineus Lloyd
Polystictus cryptomeriae P.Henn. 
Polystictus detonsus Fr.
Polystictus discipes Fr.
Polystictus doidgei Lloyd
Polystictus dybowskii Lloyd
Polystictus elongatus Fr.
Polystictus ecklonii Berk, ex Cooke accepted as Coriolopsis floccosa (Bull.) Murrill, (1903)
Polystictus fergussoni Berk, ex Cooke
Polystictus flavus Fr.
Polystictus floccosus Fr. accepted as Coriolopsis floccosa (Bull.) Murrill, (1903)
Polystictus funalis Fr.
Polystictus gallo-pavonis Cooke
Polystictus glaueo-effusus Lloyd
Polystictus glaucoporus Lloyd
Polystictus glirinus Cooke
Polystictus helvolus Fr.
Polystictus hirsutulus Cooke
Polystictus hirsutus (Wulfen) Fr. (1821), accepted as Trametes hirsuta (Wulfen) Lloyd (1924)
Polystictus hirtellus Fr.
Polystictus inconstans Cooke
Polystictus iodinus Fr.
Polystictus lanatus Fr.
Polystictus leoninus Fr.
Polystictus luteus Fr.
Polystictus macounii Lloyd
Polystictus meleagris Cooke
Polystictus meyenii Cooke
Polystictus mimetes Wakef.
Polystictus obstinatus Cooke
Polystictus occidentalis Fr.
Polystictus ochraoeus Lloyd
Polystictus pectunculus Lev.
Polystictus perennis Fr.
Polystictus perennis var. simillimus Lloyd
Polystictus pergameus Fr.
Polystictus phooinus Cooke
Polystictus pinsitus Fr.
Polystictus polyzonus Cooke
Polystictus proteus Cooke
Polystictus pubescens Fr.
Polystictus radiato-rugosus Bres.
Polystictus regius Cooke
Polystictus rugosissimus Torrend.
Polystictus sacer Fr.
Polystictus sanguineus Fr. accepted as Pycnoporus sanguineus (L.) Murrill (1904)
Polystictus scorteus Fr.
Polystictus spadiceus Cooke
Polystictus stereinus Berk. & Curt.
Polystictus stereoides Berk.
Polystictus sjubiculoides Lloyd
Polystictus subpictilis P.Henn.
Polystictus tabacinus Fr.
Polystictus torridus Fr.
Polystictus ursinus Cooke (sic) (Link) Fr., (1821), accepted as Hexagonia hydnoides (Sw.) M.Fidalgo
Polystictus vellereus Fr. (sic) (Berk.) Fr. (1851) accepted as Trametes hirsuta (Wulfen) Lloyd (1924)
Polystictus velutinus Cooke
Polystictus versicolor Fr.
Polystictus villosus Cooke
Polystictus vinosus Cooke (sic), (Berk.) Sacc. (1888) accepted as Nigroporus vinosus (Berk.) Murrill (1905)
Polystictus vittatus Fr.
Polystictus xanthopus Fr.
Polystictus xanthopus-concinnus Lloyd
Polystictus zonatus Fr.

Genus: Polystomella
Polystomella caulicola Doidge

Genus: Poria
Poria aneirina Cooke
Poria attenuata Peck.
Poria callosa Cooke
Poria citrina Mass.
Poria contigua Cooke
Poria corticola  Cooke (sic) possibly (Fr.) Sacc., (1886), accepted as Oxyporus corticola (Fr.) Ryvarden, (1972)
Poria epilintea Cooke
Poria epimiltina Lloyd
Poria ferruginosa Karst.
Poria lacticolor Murr.
Poria laevigata Karst.
Poria mollusca Cooke
Poria obliqua Karst.
Poria radula Cooke
Poria ravenelae Cooke
Poria rufitincta Berk. & Curt.
Poria sanguinolenta Cooke
Poria spissa (Schwein. ex Fr.) Cooke (1886), accepted as Ceriporia spissa (Schwein. ex Fr.) Rajchenb. (1983)
Poria subliberata Cooke (sic), possibly (Berk. & M.A.Curtis) Sacc. (1888) accepted as Rigidoporus lineatus (Pers.) Ryvarden (1972)
Poria umbrina Cooke
Poria vaporaria Cooke
Poria versipora Lloyd
Poria vincta Cooke accepted as Rigidoporus vinctus (Berk.) Ryvarden (1972)
Poria vulgaris Cooke

Genus: Porina (Lichens)
Porina albella Müll.Arg.
Porina dissipans Nyl.
Porina euryspermum Zahlbr.
Porina ferruginosa Müll.Arg.
Porina knysnana Zahlbr.
Porina tetracerae Müll.Arg.
Porina variegata Fee.

Genus: Poronia
Poronia doumetii Pat.
Poronia oedipus Mont.
Poronia punctata Linn, ex Fr.
Poronia ustorum Pat.

Genus: Porothelium
Porothelium incanum Sacc.

Pr
Genus: Prillieuxina
Prillieuxina acokantherae Ryan.
Prillieuxina burchelliae Ryan.
Prillieuxina mimusopsidis Ryan.
Prillieuxina pterocelastri Stevens.
Prillieuxina woodiana Ryan.

Genus: Protomyces
Protomyces physalidis Kalchbr.

Family: Protomycetaceae

Genus: Protostegia
Protostegia eucleae Kalchbr. & Cooke

Family: Protothyriae

Genus: Protothyrium
Protothyrium tricalysiae Doidge

Genus: Protubera
Protubera africana Lloyd

Ps
Genus: Psaliota
Psaliota abruptibulba Kauffm.
Psaliota africana Fayod.
Psaliota ambdensis Fayod.
Psaliota arvensis Quel.
Psaliota arvensis var. grossa Berk.
Psaliota augusta Quel.
Psaliota campestris Qu.
Psaliota capestris var. alba W.G.Sm.
Psaliota campestris var. pratensis Vitt.
Psaliota campestris var. rufescens W.G.Sm. 
Psaliota comtula Qu.
Psaliota dialeri Bres. & Torrend.
Psaliota dulcidula Schulz.
Psaliota exserta Rea.
Psaliota kiboga P.Henn.
Psaliota placomyces Kauffm.
Psaliota pratensis Quel.
Psaliota pratensis var. australis Berk.
Psaliota rodmani Kauffm.
Psaliota silvatica Quel.
Psaliota sylvicola Morot.

Genus: Psathyra
Psathyra corrugis Quel.
Psathyra disseminata Fr.
Psathyra noli-tangere Fr.
Psathyra spadiceo-grisea Quel.

Genus: Psathyrella
Psathyrella disseminata Quel
Psathyrella gracilis (Fr.) Quél., (1872), accepted as Psathyrella corrugis (Pers.) Konrad & Maubl. 1949
Psathyrella hydrophora Quel.
Psathyrella prona Gill.
Psathyrella subtilis Quel.
Psathyrella trepida Gill.
Psathyrella sp.

Genus: Pseudobalsamea
Pseudobalsamea microspora Diehl & Lamb.

Genus: Pseudocyphellaria (lichens)
Pseudocyphellaria aurata Wain.
Pseudocyphellaria crocata var. isidialia Gyeln.
Pseudocyphellaria gilva Malme.

Genus: Pseudographis
Pseudographis chrysophylli Doidge.

Genus: Pseudodiscosia
Pseudodiscosia dianthi Höst. & Laub.

Genus: Pseudopeziza
Pseudopeziza medacsginis Sacc.
Pseudopeziza ranunculi Fuck. f. ranunculi-pinnati Thuem.
Pseudopeziza trifolii Fuck.

Genus: Pseudophyscia
Pseudophyscia hypoleuca Hue var. colorata Zahlbr.
Pseudophyscia speciosa Müll.Arg. f. sorediosa Müll.Arg.

Genus: Pseudopyrenula (Lichens)
Pseudopyrenula papulosa Müll.Arg.

Genus: Pseudothis
Pseudothis Pterocarpi Syd.

Genus: Pseudothyridaria
Pseudothyridaria moroides Syd.

Genus: Pseudovalsa
Pseudovalsa longipes Sacc.

Genus: Psilocybe
Psilocybe areolata Sacc.
Psilocybe atro-rufa Quel.
Psilocybe atro-rufa var. montanus Pers. ex Fr.
Psilocybe ericaea Quel.
Psilocybe foenisecii Quel.
Psilocybe semilanceata Quel.
Psilocybe squalens Karst.
Psilocybe taediosa Sacc.
Psilocybe uda Gill.

Genus: Psoroma (Lichens)
Psoroma asperellum Nyl.
Psoroma sphinctrinum Nyl.

Genus: Psorotichia
Psorotichia cataractae Zahlbr.
Psorotichia fuliginella Wain.

Pt
Genus: Pterula
Pterula multifida Fr.
Pterula penicellata Berk.

Genus: Ptychogaster
Ptychogaster sp.

Pu
Genus: Puccinella
Puccinella eragrostidis Syd.

Genus: Puccinia (Rusts)
Puccinia absinthii DC.
Puccinia abutili Berk. & Br.
Puccinia acalyphae Doidge
Puccinia advena Syd.
Puccinia aecidiiformis Thuem.
Puccinia aethiopica Kalchbr. & Cooke
Puccinia afra Wint.
Puccinia africana Cooke.
Puccinia alepideae Doidge
Puccinia allii Rud.
Puccinia amadelpha Syd.
Puccinia amphilophidis Doidge
Puccinia anomala Rostr. accepted as Puccinia hordei G.H.Otth (1871)
Puccinia anthospermi Syd.
Puccinia antirrhini Diet. & Holw.
Puccinia aristidicola P.Henn.
Puccinia arundinellae Barcl.
Puccinia asparagi DC.
Puccinia atropae Mont.
Puccinia aurea Wint.
Puccinia bakoyana Pat. & Har.
Puccinia batatae Syd.
Puccinia becii Doidge.
Puccinia behenis Otth.
Puccinia berkheyicola Doidge.
Puccinia blasdalei Diet. & Holw.
Puccinia blepharidis P.Henn.
Puccinia borreriae Syd.
Puccinia bottomleyae Doidge
Puccinia bromina Erikss. 1899, accepted as Puccinia recondita Dietel & Holw. (1857)
Puccinia bulbostylidis Doidge
Puccinia bylianum Dipp.
Puccinia callistea Syd.
Puccinia canaliculate Lagerh. var. tenuis Doidge
Puccinia capensis Diet.
Puccinia capensis Syd.
Puccinia carbonacea Kalchbr. & Cooke
Puccinia caricina DC.
Puccinia caricis-cemuae Doidge.
Puccinia cephalandrae Thuem.
Puccinia chaetacanthi Doidge
Puccinia chloridis Speg.
Puccinia chrysanthemi Roze.
Puccinia cichorii Bell.
Puccinia contecta Syd.
Puccinia cookei de Toni.
Puccinia coronata Corda.
Puccinia coronifera Kleb.
Puccinia cryptica Cooke
Puccinia cyani Pass.
Puccinia cynodontis Desm.
Puccinia cyperi Arth.
Puccinia cyperi-fastigiati Doidge.
Puccinia cyperi-tagetiformis Kern.
Puccinia cyperi-tagetifonnis var. africana Doidge
Puccinia deformans Wint.
Puccinia dehiscens Syd.
Puccinia desertorum Syd.
Puccinia dichondrae Mont.
Puccinia dieramae Syd.
Puccinia digitariae Pole Evans.
Puccinia dimorpha Syd.
Puccinia dimorphothecae Pole Evans.
Puccinia discoidearum Link.
Puccinia dispersa  Erikss. & Henning 1894, accepted as Puccinia recondita Dietel & Holw. (1857)
Puccinia drimiae v.d.Byl.
Puccinia duthiei v.d.Byl.
Puccinia eragrostidis-chalcanthae Doidge
Puccinia eragrostidis-superbae Doidge
Puccinia erythraeensis Pazschke.
Puccinia eucomi Doidge
Puccinia euphorbiae P.Henn.
Puccinia evansii P.Henn.
Puccinia exanthematica MacOwan.
Puccinia exhauriens Thuem.
Puccinia eylesii Doidge
Puccinia fagarae Doidge
Puccinia feliciae Doidge
Puccinia fuirenella Doidge
Puccinia galeniae Diet.
Puccinia galerita Doidge
Puccinia galiorum Link.
Puccinia galopinae Cooke
Puccinia gerberae Pole Evans.
Puccinia gerbericola Doidge
Puccinia gladioli Cast.
Puccinia gladioli-crassifolii Doidge
Puccinia glechomatis DC.
Puccinia gnidiae Doidge
Puccinia graminis Pers. (1794),
Puccinia granularis Kalchbr. & Cooke
Puccinia helianthi Schw.
Puccinia helichrysi Kalchbr. & Cooke
Puccinia hennopsiana Doidge
Puccinia heterospora Berk. & Curt.
Puccinia holosericea Cooke
Puccinia hydrocotyles Cooke
Puccinia hyperici Doidge
Puccinia hypochoeridis Oud.
Puccinia imperatae Doidge
Puccinia inflorescenticola Pole Evans
Puccinia ipomoeae Cooke
Puccinia ipomoeae-panduratae Syd.
Puccinia iridis Wallr.
Puccinia isoglossae Doidge
Puccinia junci Wint. var. africana Doidge
Puccinia junci-oxycarpi Doidge
Puccinia kalchbrenneri de Toni.
Puccinia kalchbrenneri var. valida Doidge
Puccinia kalchbrenneriana de Toni.
Puccinia kentaniensis Pole Evans
Puccinia koedoeensis Doidge
Puccinia kraussiana Cooke
Puccinia krookii P.Henn.
Puccinia kuhnii Butler.
Puccinia kyllingicola Doidge
Puccinia lebeekiae P.Henn.
Puccinia lemanensis Doidge
Puccinia leonotidicola P.Henn.
Puccinia letestui Maubl.
Puccinia leucadis Syd.
Puccinia liebenbergii Doidge
Puccinia lindaviana P.Henn.
Puccinia lippiivora Syd.
Puccinia lolii E.Nielsen (1875), accepted as Puccinia coronata Corda (1837)
Puccinia luandensis Syd.
Puccinia luxuriosa Syd.
Puccinia lychnidearum Puck.
Puccinia lycii Kalchbr.
Puccinia macowani Wint.
Puccinia magnusiana Koem.
Puccinia malvacearum Mont.
Puccinia maydis Bereng.
Puccinia mccleanii Doidge
Puccinia melanida Syd.
Puccinia menthae Pers.
Puccinia menthae f. leonotidis Kalchbr.
Puccinia mesembryanthemi MacOwan.
Puccinia miscanthidii Doidge
Puccinia momordicae Kalchbr.
Puccinia monsoniae Doidge
Puccinia moraeae P.Henn.
Puccinia morganae Doidge
Puccinia myrsiphylli Wint.
Puccinia natalensis Diet. & Syd.
Puccinia natalensis var. evansii Doidge
Puccinia oahuensis Ell. & Everh.
Puccinia ocimi Doidge
Puccinia oedipus Cooke
Puccinia oenotherae Vize.
Puccinia ornilhogali Kalchbr.
Puccinia ornithogali-thyrsoides Diet.
Puccinia osyridicarpi Grove.
Puccinia othonnae Doidge
Puccinia pachycarpi Kalchbr. & Cooke
Puccinia pallens Syd.
Puccinia pallida Mass.
Puccinia pegleriana Doidge
Puccinia pelargonii Syd.
Puccinia pelargonii-zonalis Doidge
Puccinia penniseti Zimm.
Puccinia pentactina Doidge
Puccinia pentanisiae Cooke
Puccinia pentanisiae var. pentagynae P.Henn
Puccinia phragmitis Koem.
Puccinia phyllocladiae Cooke
Puccinia pienaarii Pole Evans.
Puccinia plectranthi Thuem.
Puccinia poarum Niels.
Puccinia pogonarthriae Hopkins.
Puccinia pole-evansii Doidge
Puccinia polycampta Syd.
Puccinia polygoni-amphibii Pers.
Puccinia popowiae Cooke
Puccinia pottsii Doidge
Puccinia pretoriensis Doidge
Puccinia printziae Thuem.
Puccinia pruni-spinosae Pers.
Puccinia pulla Kalchbr.
Puccinia pulvinata Mass.
Puccinia punctata Link.
Puccinia purpurea Cooke
Puccinia ranulipes Doidge
Puccinia rhynchosiae Kalchbr. & Cooke
Puccinia rottboelliae Syd.
Puccinia rubigo-vera Wint. f. sp. tritici Eriks. & Henn.
Puccinia rubiae Kalchbr. & Cooke
Puccinia rufipes Diet.
Puccinia salviae Ung.
Puccinia salviae-runcinata Doidge
Puccinia satyrii Syd.
Puccinia schlechteri P.Henn.
Puccinia schoenoxyphii Doidge
Puccinia scleriae-dregeana Doidge
Puccinia sorghi Schw.
Puccinia spermacoces Berk. & Curt.
Puccinia stellenboschiana v.d.Byl.
Puccinia stoboeae MacOwan.
Puccinia stoboeae var. woodii Syd.
Puccinia stonemanniae Syd. & Evans.
Puccinia striaeformis West.
Puccinia tabernaemontanae Berk. & Br.
Puccinia tabernaemontanae Cooke
Puccinia tandaaiensis Hopkins.
Puccinia tetragoniae McAlp. var. austro-africana Doidge
Puccinia thunbergiae Cooke
Puccinia torosa Thuem.
Puccinia tosta Arth.
Puccinia tragiae Cooke
Puccinia transvaalensis Doidge
Puccinia tristachyae Doidge
Puccinia triticina Erikss. (1899),
Puccinia trochomeriae Cooke
Puccinia urgines Kalchbr.
Puccinia vangueriae Doidge
Puccinia vernoniae Cooke
Puccinia vernoniicola P.Henn.
Puccinia versicolor Diet. & Holw.
Puccinia verwoerdiana v.d.Byl.
Puccinia woodiana Doidge.
Puccinia woodii Syd.
Puccinia zeae Bereng.
Puccinia zorniae McAlp.

Family: Pucciniaceae (Rusts)

Genus: Pucciniastrum
Pucciniastrum agrimoniae Tranzsch.

Genus: Pucciniopsis
Pucciniopsis caffra Wakef.
Pucciniopsis sp.

Genus: Pucciniosira
Pucciniosira dissotidis Wakef.

Genus: Pullularia
Pullularia pullulans (de Bary & Löwenthal) Berkhout (1923), sccepted as Aureobasidium pullulans (de Bary) G. Arnaud (1918)

Py
Genus: Pycnocarpon
Pycnocarpon amicta Xel.

Family: Pyrenidiaceae

Family: Pyrenocarpeae

Genus: Pyrenochaeta
Pyrenochaeta vanillae Verw. & du Pless.

Genus: Pyrenodesmia
Pyrenodesmia hampeana Massal.

Genus: Pyrenophora
Pyrenophora avenae Ito 
Pyrenophora gramineum Ito 
Pyrenophora horrida Syd.
Pyrenophora teres Drechsl.

Family: Pyrenopsidaceae

Genus: Pyrenopsis
Pyrenopsis mackenziei Jones.
Pyrenopsis robustula Müll.Arg.

Genus: Pyrenula (Lichens)
Pyrenula aspistea Ach.
Pyrenula cerina Eschw. f. expallens Zahlbr.
Pyrenula cinerea Zahlbr.
Pyrenula emergens Vain.
Pyrenula henatomma Ach.
Pyrenula knightiana Müll.Arg.
Pyrenula laevigata Am. var. incusa Zahlbr.
Pyrenula mamillana Trevis.
Pyrenula marginata Hook.
Pyrenula mastophora Müll.Arg.
Pyrenula nitida Ach.
Pyrenula nitidella Müll.Arg.
Pyrenula obtecta Merrill.
Pyrenula pleiomeriza Zahlbr.
Pyrenula subducta Müll.Arg.
Pyrenula subglabriuscula Vain. var. natalensis Vain.
Pyrenula tesselata Ach.
Pyrenula transparens Zahlbr.
Pyrenula wilmsiana Müll.Arg.

Family: Pyrenulaceae

Genus: Pyronema
Pyronema confluens Tul.
Pyronema omphaloides Fuck.
Pyronema sp.

Genus: Pyrenophora
Pyrenophora avenae Ito 
Pyrenophora horrida Syd.

Family: Pyrenopsidaceae

Genus: Pyrenopsis
Pyrenopsis mackenziei Jones.
Pyrenopsis robustula Müll.Arg.

Family: Pyrenulaceae

Genus: Pythiacystis
Pythiacystis citrophthora R.E. & E.H.Smith (1906), accepted as Phytophthora citrophthora (R.E. Sm. & E.H. Sm.) Leonian, (1906)

Genus: Pyxine (Lichens)
Pyxine cocoes Nyl.
Pyxine endoleuca Vain.
Pyxine eschweileri Vain.
Pyxine meissneri Tuck.
Pyxine meissneri var. endoleuca Müll.Arg.
Pyxine meissneri var. sorediosa Müll.Arg. 
Pyxine meissneri var. subobscurans Malme. 
Pyxine petricola Nyl.
Pyxine rhodesiaca Vain.

References

Sources

See also
 List of bacteria of South Africa
 List of Oomycetes of South Africa
 List of slime moulds of South Africa

 List of fungi of South Africa
 List of fungi of South Africa – A
 List of fungi of South Africa – B
 List of fungi of South Africa – C
 List of fungi of South Africa – D
 List of fungi of South Africa – E
 List of fungi of South Africa – F
 List of fungi of South Africa – G
 List of fungi of South Africa – H
 List of fungi of South Africa – I
 List of fungi of South Africa – J
 List of fungi of South Africa – K
 List of fungi of South Africa – L
 List of fungi of South Africa – M
 List of fungi of South Africa – N
 List of fungi of South Africa – O
 List of fungi of South Africa – P
 List of fungi of South Africa – Q
 List of fungi of South Africa – R
 List of fungi of South Africa – S
 List of fungi of South Africa – T
 List of fungi of South Africa – U
 List of fungi of South Africa – V
 List of fungi of South Africa – W
 List of fungi of South Africa – X
 List of fungi of South Africa – Y
 List of fungi of South Africa – Z

Further reading
Kinge TR, Goldman G, Jacobs A, Ndiritu GG, Gryzenhout M (2020) A first checklist of macrofungi for South Africa. MycoKeys 63: 1-48. https://doi.org/10.3897/mycokeys.63.36566

  

Fungi
Fungi P